The Preacher's Wife: Original Soundtrack Album is the soundtrack to the 1996 film of the same name and features songs performed and produced by American singer Whitney Houston, who also stars in the film. The soundtrack was released on November 26, 1996, by Arista Records and BMG Entertainment. With sales of 6 million copies worldwide, it is the best-selling gospel album of all time.

Reception

Music critics saw a more emotionally engaged side of Houston, particularly with the soundtrack's gospel offerings. “For the first time in her 12-year recording career, Houston sounds genuinely moved by her material. Early on she stumbles through the Annie Lennox-penned "Step By Step," but the presence of the Georgia Mass Choir on six subsequent tracks melts her frosty reserve,” People magazine wrote.

Commercial performance
Released on November 26, 1996, The Preacher's Wife: Original Soundtrack Album debuted at number 12 on the Billboard 200 albums chart on the issue dated December 14, 1996, selling 90,500 units in the first week. On its second week, the album jumped to number four on the chart with the Greatest Gainer mark, and the following week reached number three, which was the album's peak position. The album also debuted at number eight on the Billboard Top R&B Albums chart, and in three weeks later, peaked at the number one and remained there for two weeks, becoming her fourth number one album on the chart. It stayed for a total of 38 weeks, 49 weeks on the Billboard 200 chart and the Top R&B Albums chart respectively.

In addition, the soundtrack was more successful on the Billboard Top Gospel Albums chart. It debuted straight at number one and spent 26 consecutive weeks at the top from December 14, 1996, to June 7, 1997. It remained on the chart for 117 weeks. Eventually the album became number one gospel album on the 1997 Billboard Top Gospel Albums year-end chart and also "Best-selling Gospel Recording" by the National Association of Recording Merchandisers (NARM) in 1996–1997. It was certified 3× Platinum for shipping 3 million copies in the United States alone by the Recording Industry Association of America (RIAA) on June 30, 1998. According to the Nielsen SoundScan, as of 2012, the Gospel album has sold 2,627,000 copies in the United States alone, outranking the 2,025,000 copies sold by Madonna's Evita soundtrack, which was released two weeks earlier than Houston's album.

Prior to the album's release, music industry insiders had expected The Preacher's Wife soundtrack to "do at least as well as" Waiting to Exhale's soundtrack, which sold 5,100,000 copies in the United States.

Singles
The lead single, "I Believe in You and Me" (a cover of The Four Tops classic), became a top five hit in the U.S. and was nominated for Best Female R&B Vocal Performance at the 40th Grammy Awards, where the soundtrack overall was nominated for Best R&B Album.

"Step by Step" was another hit single, peaking at number 15 on the Billboard Hot 100 chart. "My Heart Is Calling" became the soundtrack's final release.

"Lay Aside Every Weight", covered and performed by Georgia Mass Choir and Whitney Houston, appears in the film but not on the motion picture soundtrack for unknown reasons.

Promotion and appearances

Pacific Rim Tour

Chart success of the soundtrack and its hit singles, "I Believe in You and Me" and "Step By Step", the singer further promoted the soundtrack album and singles touring across Asia, Australia, and two in North America. Known as the Pacific Rim Tour, Houston played shows in Japan, Thailand, Tawian, Australia and Hawaii. The setlist featured other tracks from the album, as well as duet performances of "Count On Me" and "In Return" with singer CeCe Winans at select shows in Japan.

Track listing
All tracks are produced by Houston and Mervyn Warren, except where noted.

Charts

Weekly charts

Year-end charts

Certifications and sales

Accolades

Academy Awards

|-
| style="width:35px; text-align:center;"|1997 || Hans Zimmer for The Preacher's Wife || Best Original Musical or Comedy Score || 
|-

American Music Awards

|-
| style="width:35px; text-align:center;"|1998 || The Preacher's Wife Original Soundtrack Album || |Favorite Soundtrack || 
|-

Blockbuster Entertainment Awards

|-
| style="width:35px; text-align:center;"|1997 || The Preacher's Wife Original Soundtrack Album || Favorite Female, R&B || 
|-
| style="width:35px; text-align:center;"|1998 || The Preacher's Wife Original Soundtrack Album || Favorite Soundtrack || 
|-

Essence Awards

|-
| style="width:35px; text-align:center;"|1997 || Whitney Houston (herself) || The Triumphant Spirit Award || 
|-

GMA (Gospel Music Association) Dove Awards

|-
| style="width:35px; text-align:center;"|1997 || Special Award || Outstanding Mainstream Contribution to Gospel Music || 
|-
| style="width:35px; text-align:center;"|1998 || "I Go to the Rock" || Traditional Gospel Song of the Year (with Dottie Rambo) || 
|-

Grammy Awards

|-
| style="width:35px; text-align:center;" rowspan="2"|1998 || The Preacher's Wife Original Soundtrack Album || |Best R&B Album || 
|-
| "I Believe in You and Me" || Best Female R&B Vocal Performance || 
|-

NAACP Image Awards

|-
| style="width:35px; text-align:center;" rowspan="2"|1997 || rowspan="2"|The Preacher's Wife Original Soundtrack Album || |Outstanding Gospel Artist (with Georgia Mass Choir) || 
|-
|Outstanding Album || 
|-

The NARM Best Seller Awards

|-
| style="width:35px; text-align:center;"|1997 || The Preacher's Wife Original Soundtrack Album || Best-selling Gospel Recording || 
|-

People's Choice Awards

|-
| style="width:35px; text-align:center;"|1998 || Whitney Houston (herself) || |Favorite Female Musical Performer (tied with Reba McEntire) || 
|-

Soul Train Music Awards

|-
| style="width:35px; text-align:center;"|1998 || Special Award || The 1998 Quincy Jones Award — for Outstanding Career Achievements in the field of entertainment || 
|-

Trumpet Awards

|-
| style="width:35px; text-align:center;"|1998 || Whitney Houston (herself) || The Pinnacle Award || 
|-

See also
List of number-one R&B albums of 1997 (U.S.)

References

External links
 The Preacher's Wife: Soundtrack Album at Allmusic
 The Preacher's Wife: Soundtrack Album at Discogs

Whitney Houston albums
Albums produced by Stephen Lipson
Albums produced by David Foster
1996 soundtrack albums
Comedy-drama film soundtracks
Arista Records soundtracks
Albums produced by Whitney Houston